Exequiel Ramírez (20 September 1924 – May 2000) was a Chilean cyclist. He competed in the individual and team road race events at the 1948 Summer Olympics.

References

External links
 

1924 births
2000 deaths
Chilean male cyclists
Olympic cyclists of Chile
Cyclists at the 1948 Summer Olympics
Sportspeople from Santiago
Pan American Games medalists in cycling
Pan American Games gold medalists for Chile
Cyclists at the 1951 Pan American Games